Convoy ON 115 was a trade convoy of 43 merchant ships with 12 escort ships during the Second World War. The convoy departed Liverpool on 24 July 1942 and arrived at Boston on 8 August.  Three ships were lost to U-boats during the crossing and two were damaged.

Name
It was the 115th of the numbered series of ON convoys Outbound from the British Isles to North America.

Action
The ships departed Liverpool on 24 July 1942 and were joined on 25 July by Mid-Ocean Escort Force Group C-3. They were found on 29 July by the seven U-boats of Wolfpack Wolf. Six U-boats formed Wolfpack Pirat on 1 August and reached the convoy on 2 August. Three ships were sunk before contact was lost in misty weather on 3 August. Surviving ships reached Boston on 8 August.

Ships in the convoy

References

Bibliography

External links
ON.115 at convoyweb

ON115
Naval battles of World War II involving Canada